Danou is a commune in the Cercle of Bougouni in the Sikasso Region of southern Mali. The principal town lies at Torakoro. In 1998 the commune had a population of 8,869.

References

Communes of Sikasso Region